FUV may refer to:

 Arcimoto, American electric vehicle company (NASDAQ stock symbol FUV)
 Far ultraviolet
 Fula language
 Fulbright University Vietnam